Birkenside is a village in the Scottish Borders, Scotland.

Villages in the Scottish Borders